The  is an archaeological site in the Tanigahara neighborhood of Midori-ku, Sagamihara, Kanagawa Prefecture, in the southern Kantō region of Japan containing a middle to late Jōmon period settlement trace. It was designated a National Historic Site of Japan in 1931, with then area under protection expanded in 2006.

Overview
Kawajiri Stone Age Site is located on the north bank fluvial terrace of the Sagami River where the river changes course from east to south after it emerges onto the Sagami Plain. The site has long been known to be rich in relics, and per an archaeological excavation conducted in 1929  the remains of a flagstone-floored Jōmon period pit dwelling was confirmed. The ruin were estimated to be between 3000 and 4000 years old, and as the existence of such flagstone-floored dwelling in southern Kantō was regarded as rare at the time, it was designated as a National Historic Site in 1931. Since then, the area has been repeated excavated, and by time of the 1989 survey, the remains of forty-six pit dwellings from the middle Jōmon period and one flagstone-floored dwelling from then late Jōmon period were confirmed. In addition, the traces of a Kofun period to Heian period settlement was also discovered, indicating that the area had been a settlement for many centuries. In total, more than 80 dwelling sites have been identified. Artifacts included stone axes, whetstones, jar-shaped Jōmon pottery, and clay figurines. In addition to the dwelling traces, a number of stone-lined tombs were also found.  

The National Historic Site designation was expanded in 2006 to cover these additional discoveries. The site is located a five-minute walk from the  "Kubosawa" bus stop on the Kanagawa Bus from Hashimoto Station on the JR East Yokohama Line.

See also

List of Historic Sites of Japan (Kanagawa)

References

External links
Sagamihara City home page 

Archaeological sites in Japan
Jōmon period
Sagamihara
History of Kanagawa Prefecture
Historic Sites of Japan